The Hongshan culture was a Neolithic culture in the West Liao river basin in northeast China. Hongshan sites have been found in an area stretching from Inner Mongolia to Liaoning, and dated from about 4700 to 2900 BC.

The culture is named after , a site in Hongshan District, Chifeng. The  site was discovered by the Japanese archaeologist Torii Ryūzō in 1908 and extensively excavated in 1935 by Kōsaku Hamada and Mizuno Seiichi.

Historical context
In northeast China, Hongshan culture was preceded by Xinglongwa culture (6200–5400 BC), Xinle culture (5300–4800 BC), and Zhaobaogou culture, which may be contemporary with Xinle and a little later.

The Yangshao culture of the Yellow River existed contemporaneously with the Hongshan culture (see map). These two cultures interacted with each other.

Hongshan culture was succeeded by the Lower Xiajiadian culture (2200–1600 BC), which was replaced by a different Upper Xiajiadian culture (1000-600 BC) with a shift from farming to pastoral nomadism, likely due to climate change. In the historical period, the West Liao basin was mainly populated by nomads.

Genetics and linguistic identity 
A genetic study by Yinqiu Cui et al. from 2013 analyzed the Y-chromosome DNA haplogroup based N subclade; it found that DNA samples from 63% of the combined samples from various Hongshan archaeological sites belonged to the subclade N1 (xN1a, N1c) of the paternal haplogroup N-M231 and calculated N to have been the predominant haplogroup in the region in the Neolithic period at 89%, with its share gradually declining over time. Today, this haplogroup is found in northern Han, Mongols, Manchu, Oroqen, Xibe and Hezhe at low frequencies. Other paternal haplogroups identified in the study were C and O3a (O3a3), both of which predominate among the present-day inhabitants of the region.

Nelson et al. 2020 attempts to link the Hongshan culture to a "Transeurasian" (Altaic) linguistic context. According to a study on genetic distance measurements from a large scale genetic study from 2021 titled 'Genomic insights into the formation of human populations in East Asia', hunter-gatherers of Mongolia and the Amur River Basin have ancestry shared by Mongolic and Tungusic language speakers, but they did not carry West Liao River farmer ancestry, contradicting the Transeurasian hypothesis proposed by Martine Robbeets et al. that the expansion of West Liao River farmers spread these proto-languages.

A 2020 study discovered substantial genetic changes in the West Liao River region over time. An increase in the reliance on millet farming between the Middle-to-Late Neolithic is associated with higher genetic affinity to the Yellow River basin (generally associated with speakers of the Sino-Tibetan languages), while a partial switch to pastoralism in the Bronze Age Upper Xiajiadian culture is associated with a decrease in this genetic affinity. After the Late Neolithic, there was a sharp transition from Yellow River to Amur River-related genetic profiles (associated with speakers of Tungusic languages) around the West Liao River. This increase in Amur River affinity corresponds with the transition to a pastoral economy during the Bronze Age.

A 2021 study found that Yellow River millet farmers from the modern-day provinces of Henan and Shandong had played an important role in the formation of Hongshan people or their descendants via both inland and coastal northward migration routes.

Agriculture 
Similarly to the Yangshao culture, the Hongshan culture cultivated millet. Isotope analyses revealed that millet contributed up to 70% of the human diet in the Early Hongshan and up to 80% in the Late Hongshan.

Artifacts
The Hongshan culture is known for its carved jade. Hongshan burial artifacts include some of the earliest known examples of jade working. The Hongshan culture is known for its jade pig dragons and embryo dragons. Clay figurines, including figurines of pregnant women, are also found throughout Hongshan sites. Small copper rings were also excavated.

Religion

The archaeological site at Niuheliang is a unique ritual complex associated with the Hongshan culture.

Excavators have discovered an underground temple complex—which included an altar—and also cairns in Niuheliang. The temple was constructed of stone platforms, with painted walls. Archaeologists have given it the name "Goddess Temple" due to the discovery of a clay female head with jade inlaid eyes. It was an underground structure, 1m deep. Included on its walls are mural paintings. Housed inside the Goddess Temple are clay figurines as large as three times the size of real-life humans. The exceedingly large figurines are possibly deities, but for a religion not reflective in any other Chinese culture.

The existence of complex trading networks and monumental architecture (such as pyramids and the Goddess Temple) point to the existence of a "chiefdom" in these prehistoric communities.

Painted pottery was also discovered within the temple. Over 60 nearby tombs have been unearthed, all constructed of stone and covered by stone mounds, frequently including jade artifacts.

Cairns were discovered atop two nearby two hills, with either round or square stepped tombs, made of piled limestone.  Entombed inside were sculptures of dragons and tortoises.

It has been suggested that religious sacrifice might have been performed within the Hongshan culture.

Feng shui
Just as suggested by evidence found at early Yangshao culture sites, Hongshan culture sites also provide the earliest evidence for feng shui. The presence of both round and square shapes at Hongshan culture ceremonial centres suggests an early presence of the  cosmography ("round heaven, square earth").

Early feng shui relied on astronomy to find correlations between humans and the universe.

Development of Chinese civilization
The Hongshan culture region was thought to have been desert for the past 1 million years. However, a 2015 study found that the region once featured rich aquatic resources and deep lakes and forests that existed from 12,000 years ago to 4,000 years ago. It was changed into desert by climate change which began approximately 4,200 years ago. Therefore, some of the people of the Hongshan culture may have emigrated south to the Yellow River valley approximately 4,000 years ago.  Archaeological evidence discovered at the Miaozigou site in Ulanqab, Inner Mongolia, a northern branch of the Yangshao culture from the Yellow River (the Yangshao culture is speculated to be the origin of the Sino-Tibetan languages) demonstrates similarities in the material cultures between the Yellow River and Liao River cultures. Three individuals from the Miaozigou site belonged to haplogroup N1(xN1a, N1c), while the main lineage of Yellow River valley cultures is O3-M122. The existence of N1(xN1a, N1c) among the Miaozigou individuals could serve as evidence for the migration of some of the Hongshan people.

Some Chinese archaeologists such as Guo Da-shun see the Hongshan culture as an important stage of early Chinese civilization. Whatever the linguistic affinity of the ancient denizens, Hongshan culture is believed to have exerted an influence on the development of early Chinese civilization.

The culture may have also contributed to the development of settlements in ancient Korea. However, the Hongshan culture is also commonly employed in Korean pseudohistory by some Korean scholars, who seek to contest any connections between the Hongshan culture with Chinese civilization and assert that the Hongshan culture is only related to Korean civilization.

See also
 List of Neolithic cultures of China
 Xinglonggou

References

 Allan, Sarah (ed), The Formation of Chinese Civilization: An Archaeological Perspective, 
 Chang, Kwang-chih. The Archaeology of Ancient China, 
 Nelson, Sarah Milledge (ed), The Archaeology of Northeast China: Beyond the Great Wall,

External links

Hongshan culture Galleries
Discussion of Hongshan culture

Archaeology of Inner Mongolia
Neolithic cultures of China
History of Liaoning
5th-millennium BC establishments